Josef Siegers (born 15 October 1907, date of death unknown) was a German long-distance runner. He competed in the men's 10,000 metres at the 1936 Summer Olympics.

References

1907 births
Year of death missing
Athletes (track and field) at the 1936 Summer Olympics
German male long-distance runners
Olympic athletes of Germany
Place of birth missing